Turnabout Valley is a partially deglaciated valley between Finger Mountain and Pyramid Mountain, in the Quartermain Mountains, Victoria Land. Named by the Victoria University of Wellington Antarctic Expedition (VUWAE), 1958–59.

Further reading
  B. C. McKELVEY and P. N. WEBB, GEOLOGICAL INVESTIGATIONS IN SOUTH VICTORIA LAND, ANTARCTICA, Department of Geology, Victoria University of Wellington 
 New Zealand Journal of Geology and Geophysics, P 722

Valleys of Victoria Land
McMurdo Dry Valleys